is a 2014 Japanese live-action musical crime comedy film based on Santa Inoue's Tokyo Tribes manga series. It was directed by Sion Sono and was released in Japan on August 30, 2014.

Plot
The film is set in an alternate Japan where street gangs collectively known as the Tokyo Tribes control their respective territories and are in continuous conflict. Mera, the head of the Wu-Ronz tribe of Bukuro, joins forces with the violent and sadistic gangster Buppa of Buppa Town with the intent of initiating a gang war between the Wu-Ronz and the Musashino Saru tribes. When it comes to a confrontation between the two tribes, Mera attempts to kill Kai, a popular member of the Musashino Saru tribe. During the attempt Mera accidentally kills Kai's friend Tera, another member of the Musashino Saru tribe who has been beloved by members of all Tribes since before their formation. This causes all of the other Tokyo Tribes to join forces against Mera and Buppa's forces, leading to an all-out gang war.

Tokyo Tribe mirrors apocalyptic  art  house violence, horror musical and tribalistic themes from films such as Mad Max, Do the Right Thing, Rocky Horror Picture Show and various Tarantino films. The  film is almost entirely scripted in old school hip hop rhyme.

Cast

Ryōhei Suzuki as Mera
Riki Takeuchi as Buppa
Young Dais as Kai Deguchi
Nana Seino as Sunmi/Erika
Shunsuke Daitō as Iwao
Takuya Ishida as Kim
Yui Ichikawa as Nori-chan
Bernard Ackah as Jadakins
Joey Beni as Kamekachi
Arata Matsuura as Skunk
Yuku Ishii as Hasheem
Makato Sakaguchi as Yon
Kokone Sasaki as rookie police officer
Hideo Nakano as veteran police officer
Hisako Ōkata as DJ
Akira Yamamoto
Akio Joe
Yoshiyuki Yamaguchi as Chikatilo
Akahiro Kitamura as Mukade
Yoshihiro Takayama as Bouncer
Motoki Fukami
Hitomi Katayama as Yoko
Hiroki Yahiki
Haruna Yabuki
Cyborg Kaori as Beatboxing maidservant
Mao Mita
Miyuki Yokoyama
Shintaro Hazama
Hirokazu Tategata
Yuki Izumisawa
Stephanie
Santa Inoue as Lotus Chief
Mika Kanō as Erendia
Shōko Nakagawa as Kesha
Kunihiko Kawakami as MC Kan
Mega-G as Mega-G
D.O.
Neri-Motha Fuckerz
Ego
Simon
Ys
KOHH
Tokage
Young Hastle
Loota
Vito Foccacio
DJ Ken Watanabe
Vikn
Mary Jane
Anarchy
Jesse
Denden as Daishisai
Aki Hiraoka as Nezumi
Jōi Iwanaga
Tomoko Karina
Yōsuke Kubozuka as Nkoi
Pacmna as Large Diner
Ryūta Satō as Tera
Shōta Sometani as MC Show
Takeshi James Yamada

Box office
The film earned  at the Japanese box office by September 14, 2014.

Reception
Mike Hale of The New York Times called the film "an eccentric project" even for Sion Sono and found that the biggest problem was the "screenplay by Mr. Sono that doesn't provide much motivation for all the insults, battles and chases (and casual mistreatment of women)".
Martin Tsai of the Los Angeles Times gave the film a negative review, criticizing its "uninspired violence and misogyny" and found that "the film suggests that these mobsters are driven to conquer only to overcompensate for the inadequacy of their manhoods".
Dennis Harvey of Variety.com also criticized the music, writing that the "soundtrack's mostly generic old-school beats support lyrics by a host of Japanese performers (many of whom have roles here) that are often funny — sometimes inadvertently, but mostly in a deliberately crass, obscene-boasting way" and that "delivery ranges from the decent to the dreadful".

References

External links

2014 films
2010s Japanese-language films
2010s Japanese films
Japanese action comedy films
Japanese musical comedy films
2014 action comedy films
2010s musical comedy films
Films directed by Sion Sono
Films set in Tokyo
Live-action films based on manga
Tokyo Tribes
2010s gang films